Province of Dublin may refer to:

 Province of Dublin (Church of Ireland)
 Province of Dublin (Roman Catholic)